Peter Lee Thorne (born 21 June 1973) is an English retired professional footballer, who played as a striker.

He played for a number of clubs in his career scoring just short of 200 goals. He started his career with Blackburn Rovers, but failed to make a single league appearance in four years before he left to join Swindon Town. He went on to play for Stoke City and Cardiff City, making more than 100 appearances for each. In 2005, he moved to Norwich City where he scored just one goal in two seasons and was on the verge of retiring until he moved to Bradford City. In two seasons, he was top scorer with Bradford, before leaving before the end of his third season and deciding to retire at the age of 36.

Career

Early career
Thorne was born in Urmston, Lancashire and started his career at Blackburn Rovers. His only first team appearance came when he appeared in the 1994 FA Charity Shield at Wembley Stadium, he replaced Mark Atkins in the 64th minute of the 2–0 defeat against Manchester United. After a loan spell at Wigan Athletic, he signed for Swindon Town during the 1994–95 season, helping them reach the Football League Cup semi-finals but not being able to prevent relegation to the Second Division. However, his goals helped them win promotion back to First Division at the first attempt, and secure survival in the 1996–97 season.

Stoke City
Thorne joined Stoke City in July 1997 after manager Chic Bates paid £500,000 for his services. He was signed as a replacement for Mike Sheron who joined Queens Park Rangers. He top-scored with 16 goals in 1997–98 which was unable to prevent Stoke suffering relegation to the Second Division. He struggled for form in 1998–99 scoring 11 goals before he became a regular goalscorer in 1999–2000. He scored 30 goals as Stoke reached the play-offs where they lost out to Gillingham. During the season Thorne scored four goals against Chesterfield on 4 March 2000 becoming the first Stoke player to score four goals in a single match since John Ritchie in 1966. He also scored the winning goal in the 2000 Football League Trophy Final. Thorne again top-scored in 2000–01 with 19 goals as Stoke again failed in the play-offs this time against Walsall. Thorne began the 2001–02 season well scoring four goals in five matches before he left to join Graham Kavanagh at Cardiff City. In Total Thorne scored 80 goals for Stoke in 189 appearances.

Cardiff City
In September 2001, he was signed by Cardiff City for a club-record £1.7 million. His first season at the club was restricted due to injury but he still managed to finish the year with a total of 8 goals. The following season, 2002–03, he enjoyed a full season and linked up with the club's talisman striker Robert Earnshaw, the pair scoring a total of 52 goals between them, as they helped the club to win promotion via the play-offs. Thorne found the net 16 times during the season, including scoring against Bristol City in the first leg of the play-off semi-final.

Thorne remained a vital part of the team the next year and had scored 13 times when he fractured a bone in his foot meaning he missed the last three months of the season. Injuries would mean he rarely managed an extended run in the side during the rest of his time at the club and at the end of the 2004–05 season he was allowed to join Norwich City on a free transfer, although the Canaries would have had to pay a total of £200,000 had they reached the Premiership within two years of the transfer, to reduce the club's wage bill, with Thorne being the club's highest paid player at the time, after it was revealed they were in serious financial difficulties.

Norwich City
Thorne's career chances were limited at Norwich. He missed the start of the 2005–06 season through injury and then failed to establish himself as a first team regular, scoring just one goal during the season. In the summer of 2006, Norwich manager Nigel Worthington indicated that Thorne would be allowed to leave the club if a suitable offer was received. He remained on Norwich's books for the 2006–07 season, but was released at the end of the season. He considered retiring but subsequently signed for recently relegated League Two side Bradford City on a one-year contract. He scored twice for Norwich, with strikes against Watford in the league and Rotherham United in the League Cup.

Bradford City
A hip injury kept the striker out of the start of the campaign but he eventually made his belated league début in a 2–1 defeat of Lincoln City at Sincil Bank on 7 September 2007 where he had a goal disallowed. He scored his first goal for Bradford – his first for more than a year – in a 1–0 FA Cup victory over Chester City on 10 November 2007, before scoring his first league goal a week later at Dagenham & Redbridge. He scored Bradford's first league hat-trick in two years when he scored all three goals in a 3–0 victory over Notts County on 12 January 2008. With two games in three days, Thorne was rested for City's game with Rotherham United on 22 March 2008, before he scored the 150th league goal of his career two days later, when City beat Chesterfield 1–0. When City first signed Thorne, they included the option to extend his deal by a further year, and in March 2008, Thorne extended his contract to the end of the 2008–09 season.

Thorne started the 2008–09 season by scoring two goals in each of the first two league games as City defeated Notts County and Macclesfield Town. He added a fifth in the first three games to help City maintain an unbeaten start to the season with a 2–0 win against Rochdale. He missed a penalty in City's fourth game as they lost to Aldershot Town by one goal, but his form earned him a League Two player of the month nomination for August and he made amends by scoring another three goals in the next two games, as Bradford secured back-to-back victories. Although he failed to win the player of the month award, in September he was rewarded with the PFA fans' monthly prize. Thorne topped the goalscoring charts for the division at the start of the season, and had scored 11 by the start of November, but his form tailed off and he was also hampered by a shoulder injury. He waited four months for his next goal which came as a late consolation against Notts County at the end of February before he scored another two the following weekend in a 5–0 defeat of Aldershot Town. He finished the season with 17 goals. He signed a new one-year contract with Bradford in June 2009 and he was appointed as club captain ahead of the 2009–10 season, but he suffered an injury setback and was out of the team until January 2010, returning after scoring for the reserves. In March 2010, he was released from his contract by new manager Peter Taylor having failed to score during his third season with City. As a result, Thorne decided to retire from playing.

Personal life
Thorne enjoys surfing, a hobby he took up as a teenager.

Career statistics

Honours
Blackburn Rovers
FA Charity Shield: runner-up: 1994

Stoke City
Football League Trophy: winner: 2000

Cardiff City
 Football League Second Division play-offs final winner: 2003

References

External links
 
 Career information at ex-canaries.co.uk

1973 births
Living people
People from Urmston
English footballers
Blackburn Rovers F.C. players
Wigan Athletic F.C. players
Swindon Town F.C. players
Stoke City F.C. players
Cardiff City F.C. players
Norwich City F.C. players
Bradford City A.F.C. players
English Football League players
Association football forwards